"Anonymous" is the second single from Bobby Valentino's second studio album, Special Occasion. The song features and was produced by Timbaland.

Background information
The song was written by Ezekiel "Zeke" Lewis, Balewa Muhammad, Candice Nelson, and Patrick "J. Que" Smith of the popular songwriting/production team The Clutch. In addition, it shares a drum sample with the Three 6 Mafia song "Stay Fly," originally sampled from an earlier Willie Hutch song titled "Tell Me Why Our Love Turned Cold." The track has an intro reminiscent of Justin Timberlake's "My Love" and also shares similar vocals and lyrics to "Tell Me Why Our Love Turned Cold".

The music video (directed by Bernard Gourley) includes Steph Jones from the Disturbing Tha Peace family and model Nazanin Mandi as Valentino's love interest. However, Timbaland does not appear in the video, while his verse remains. "Anonymous" peaked at No. 49 on the U.S. Billboard Hot 100.

Remixes
"Anonymous (Official Remix)" featuring Consequence and Timbaland
"Anonymous (Remix)" featuring Stimuli
"Anonymous (Remix)" featuring Young Buck & The Game
"Anonymous (Remix)" featuring Jay Read
"Anonymous (Remix)" featuring Tango
The dance in the video was choreographed and performed by Timothy Fahey and Hiroka Mcrae.

Charts

Weekly charts

Year-end charts

References

2007 singles
2007 songs
Bobby V songs
Timbaland songs
Def Jam Recordings singles
Contemporary R&B ballads
Song recordings produced by Timbaland
Songs written by Timbaland
Songs written by Candice Nelson (songwriter)
Songs written by Ezekiel Lewis
Songs written by Balewa Muhammad
Songs written by Jerome "J-Roc" Harmon
Songs written by Patrick "J. Que" Smith